Steven Emmanuel Godfroid Kunduma (born 16 March 1990) is a footballer who plays for Belgian club KSV Temse as a midfielder. Born in Belgium, he represents Rwanda at international level.

Career
Godfroid has played club football in Belgium for Charleroi, Jeunesse Turque and Saint-Gilloise. Godfroid joined KSV Temse ahead of the 2019–20 season.

He made his international debut for Rwanda in 2012, and has appeared in FIFA World Cup qualifying matches.

References

1990 births
Living people
Sportspeople from Charleroi
Footballers from Hainaut (province)
Belgian footballers
Rwandan footballers
Rwandan expatriate footballers
Rwanda international footballers
Association football midfielders
Royale Union Saint-Gilloise players
K.V. Woluwe-Zaventem players
Francs Borains players
Belgian people of Rwandan descent
Belgian sportspeople of African descent